Bray Cove Halt railway station served a cove to the south of the town of Bray in County Wicklow, Ireland. The station was also known as Naylor's Cove Halt.

The station opened on 3 September 1906, and closed finally in August 1929. The station was only open for two short periods, the first of 2 years, the second of only 2 months.

Routes

References

Buildings and structures in Bray, County Wicklow
Disused railway stations in County Wicklow
Railway stations opened in 1906
Railway stations closed in 1908
Railway stations opened in 1929
Railway stations closed in 1929
1906 establishments in Ireland
Railway stations in the Republic of Ireland opened in the 20th century